Marjeh Square ( / ALA-LC: sāḥat al-Marjah), also known as "Martyrs' Square" ( sāḥat ash-Shuhadā’), is a square in central Damascus, Syria, just outside the walls of the old city. The Syrian Interior Ministry has its headquarters in the square.

History
The square was built by the Ottomans in the late nineteenth century. A new post office and municipality were built there using steel and cement, new materials for Damascus at that time. The Ottomans publicly executed seven Syrian national activists in the square on Martyrs' Day, 6 May 1916, and it is for this reason known as "Martyrs' Square". After the French took control of Syria they continued to use the square for the same purpose. Fakhri Hassan al-Kharrat, son of the Great Syrian Revolt leader Hasan al-Kharrat, was hanged there in 1925–26. On 18 May 1965, Israeli spy Eli Cohen was publicly hanged in Marjeh Square.

References

1890 establishments in the Ottoman Empire
Squares in Damascus